47th Street (Kenwood) is a commuter rail  station within the city of Chicago that serves the Metra Electric Line north to Millennium Station and south to University Park, Blue Island, Illinois, and the neighborhood of South Chicago. As of 2018, the station is the 191st busiest of Metra's 236 non-downtown stations, with an average of 94 weekday boardings. This station is a flag stop picking up passengers only when visible to train conductor and discharging passengers only when conductors are notified. Passengers can only exit the train from the first car. The first station at this location was originally built by the Illinois Central Railroad (ICRR).

Bus connections
CTA
 2 Hyde Park Express
 6 Jackson Park Express
 28 Stony Island 
 47 47th

References

External links 

Station from Google Maps Street View

Former Illinois Central Railroad stations
Metra stations in Chicago